Jessica Steele (9 May 1933 – 23 November 2020) was a British author of 88 romance novels that spanned a career over four decades, Her novels have been published by Mills & Boon since 1979 starting with The Icicle Heart. Her last novel was  The Girl From Honeysuckle Farm and it was published in 2009.

Biography
Steele was born in Royal Leamington Spa, Warwickshire, England. She worked initially as a clerk and she married in 1967. She travelled to Hong Kong, China, Mexico, Japan, Peru, Russia, Egypt, Chile and Greece in order to establishing a background for her novels.

Bibliography

Single Novels

 The Icicle Heart (1979)
 Hostage to Dishonour (1979)
 Hostile Engagement (1979)
 Spring Girl (1979)
 Pride's Master (1979)
 Intimate Friends (1979)
 The Other Woman (1980)
 Turbulent Covenant (1980)
 Magic of His Kiss (1980)
 Price to be Met (1980)
 Devil in Disguise (1980)
 Innocent Abroad (1981)
 Bachelor's Wife (1981)
 Gallant Antagonist (1981)
 Other Brother (1981)
 But Know Not Why (1982)
 Dishonest Woman (1982)
 Distrust Her Shadow (1982)
 No Quiet Refuge (1983)
 Reluctant Relative (1983)
 Tethered Liberty (1983)
 Intimate Enemies (1983)
 Tomorrow - Come Soon (1983)
 Bond of Vengeance (1984)
 Ruthless in all (1984)
 Imprudent Challenge (1984)
 Facade (1984)
 No Holds Barred (1984)
 No Honourable Compromise (1985)
 Promise to Dishonour (1985)
 So Near, So Far (1986)
 Misleading Encounter (1986)
 Beyond Her Control (1986)
 Relative Strangers (1987)
 Unfriendly Alliance (1987)
 Fortunes of Love (1988)
 Without Love (1988)
 When the Loving Stopped (1988)
 To Stay Forever (1989)
 Farewell to Love (1989)
 Frozen Enchantment (1989)
 Unfriendly Proposition (1989)
 Passport to Happiness (1990)
 Hidden Heart (1990)
 A First Time for Everything (1990)
 Bad Neighbours (1991)
 Without Knowing Why (1991)
 Flight of Discovery (1991)
 Runaway from Love (1991)
 His Woman (1991)
 Destined to Meet (1992)
 Hungarian Rhapsody (1992)
 Italian Invader (1993)
 Relative Values (1993)
 West of Bohemia (1993)
 Heartless Pursuit (1995)
 With His Ring (1996)
 A Business Engagement (1997)
 The Trouble with Trent! (1997)
 Temporary Girlfriend (1997)
 A Most Eligible Bachelor (1998)
 Nine-to-five Affair (1999)
 After Hours (1999)
 The Bachelor's Bargain (1999)
 A Suitable Husband (2001)
 His Pretend Mistress (2002)
 An Accidental Engagement (2003)
 A Pretend Engagement (2004)
 A Most Suitable Wife (2005)
 Promise Of A Family (2006)
 The Boss and His Secretary (2007)
 Engaged to Be Married? (2008)
 Her Hand In Marriage (2008)
 Falling for Her Convenient Husband (2009)
 The Girl from Honeysuckle Farm (2009)

Fereday Twins Series
 The Sister Secret (1995)
 A Wife in Waiting (1996)

The Marriage Pledge Series
 The Feisty Fiance (2000)
 Bachelor in Need (2000)
 Marriage in Mind (2000)

Kids & Kisses Series Multi-Author
 Bachelor's Family (1995)

Today's Woman Series Multi-Author
 The Marriage Business (1995)

Family Ties Series Multi-Author
 The Sister Secret (1995)

Holding Out for a Hero Multi-Author
 Unexpected Engagement (1996)

Whirlwind Weddings Multi-Author
 Married in a Moment (1998)

Marrying The Boss Series Multi-Author
 Agenda, Attraction! (1998)

White Weddings Series Multi-Author
 A Wedding Worth Waiting for (1999)

To Have and To Hold Series Multi-Author
 Part-Time Marriage (2001)

Nine to Five Series Multi-Author
 A Professional Marriage (2002)
 Her Boss's Marriage Agenda (2004)

High Society Brides Multi-Author
 A Paper Marriage (2003)

Contract Brides Series Multi-Author
 Vacancy: Wife of Convenience (2005)

Collections
 9 to 5 (1998)
 Misleading Encounter / Fortunes of Love (2004)
 Feisty Fiancee / Bachelor in Need (2005)

Omnibus In Collaboration
 The Jasmine Bride / Sweet Promise / Turbulent Covenant (1987) (with Daphne Clair and Janet Dailey)
 Island of Escape / Stormy Affair / Hostile Engagement (1987) (with Dorothy Cork and Margaret Mayo)
 Trodden Paths / Voyage of the Mistral / Innocent Abroad (1989) (with Jacqueline Gilbert and Madeleine Ker)
 Contract Husbands (2003) (with Helen Brooks and Catherine George)
 Marrying the Boss (2003) (with Helen Brooks and Alison Roberts)
 White Wedding (2004) (with Judy Christenberry and Margaret Way)
 A Christmas To Remember (2004) (with Debbie Macomber and Betty Neels)
 All I Want for Christmas... (2005) (with Betty Neels and Margaret Way)
 After Office Hours... (2006) (with Helen Brooks and Lee Wilkinson)
 Bedded by Her Boss (2007) (with Amanda Browning and Sharon Kendrick)
 Mistress by Persuasion (2008) (with Robyn Donald and Lee Wilkinson)
 The Boss's Proposal (2008) (with Patricia Thayer and Margaret Way)

References

External links
 Jessica Steele's Webpage in Harlequin Enterprises Ltd
 Jessica Steele's Webpage in Fantastic Fiction's Website

1933 births
English romantic fiction writers
Living people
English women novelists
Women romantic fiction writers